Abusir (  ; Egyptian pr wsjr;  , "the House or Temple of Osiris") is the name given to an ancient Egyptian archaeological pyramid complex comprising the ruins of 14 pyramids dating to the Old Kingdom period, and is part of the Pyramid Fields of the Memphis and its Necropolis UNESCO World Heritage Site. 

The pyramid complex is named after the neighbouring village of Abusir, in the markaz (county) of Badrashin, Giza. The Abusir pyramid complex is located on the Western Desert plateau at the edge of the cultivated plain, with the Giza Pyramids to its north, and Saqqara to its south, and served as one of the main elite cemeteries for the ancient Egyptian capital city of Memphis. Several other villages in northern and southern Egypt are named Abusir or Busiri.

The locality of Abusir took its turn as the focus of the prestigious western burial rites operating out of the then-capital of Memphis during the Old Kingdom 5th Dynasty. As an elite cemetery, neighbouring Giza had by then "filled up" with the massive pyramids and other monuments of the 4th Dynasty, leading the 5th Dynasty pharaohs to seek sites elsewhere for their own funerary monuments.

Abusir was the origin of the largest find of Old Kingdom papyri to date — the Abusir Papyri. In the late nineteenth century, a number of Western museums acquired collections of fragmentary papyri from the administrative (temple) records of one Abusir funerary cult, that of king Neferirkare Kakai. This discovery was supplemented in the late twentieth century when excavations by a Czech expedition to the site revealed papyri from two other cult complexes, that of the pharaoh Neferefre (also read Raneferef) and for the king's mother Khentkaus II.

The Czech Institute of Egyptology of the Faculty of Arts, Charles University in Prague has been conducting excavations at Abusir since 1976. They are presently directed by Miroslav Bárta.

There are considerable catacombs near the ancient town of Busiris (Pliny xxxvi. 12. s. 16). To the south of Busiris one great cemetery appears to have stretched over the plain. The Heptanomite Busiris was in fact a hamlet standing at one extremity of the necropolis of Memphis.

Necropolis

There are a total of 14 pyramids at this site, which served as the main royal necropolis during the Fifth Dynasty. The quality of construction of the Abusir pyramids is inferior to those of the Fourth Dynasty; perhaps signalling a decrease in royal power or a less vibrant economy. They are smaller than their predecessors, and are built of low quality local stone. All of the major pyramids at Abusir were built as step pyramids, although the largest of them—the Pyramid of Neferirkare—is believed to have originally been built as a step pyramid some seventy metres in height and then later transformed into a "true" pyramid by having its steps filled in with loose masonry.

Major pyramids
The three major pyramids are 
 the Pyramid of Neferirkare Kakai, the tallest pyramid at the site
 the Pyramid of Niuserre, the most intact pyramid at the site
 the Pyramid of Sahure known for its finely carved reliefs

Smaller pyramids
 the incomplete Pyramid of Neferefre
 the pyramid of Queen Khentkaus II, wife of Neferirkare and mother of Neferefre and Niuserre
 the unfinished pyramid of Shepseskare? 
 Lepsius Pyramid no. 24 — The pyramid belonged to a woman, likely a queen. The name of the vizier Ptahshepses appears among builders' marks, which dates the pyramid to the time of Pharaoh Nyuserre 
 Lepsius Pyramid no. 25 — Likely the pyramid of a queen from the Fifth Dynasty

Mastabas of courtiers
The tombs of several high officials and family members are located in the direct vicinity of their king's pyramid:
 the mastaba of Ptahshepses (vizier under Nyuserre)
 the mastaba of Prince Nakhtkare (son of Raneferef or Nyuserre)

Abusir-south
Directly north of Saqqara is a cemetery of lower-ranking officials of the Old Kingdom, including the following tombs:
 the tomb of Ity (Third Dynasty)
 the tomb of Hetepi (priest, beginning of Third Dynasty)
 the tomb of Kaaper (architect and priest, Fourth Dynasty)
 the tomb of Rahotep (priest, end of Fifth Dynasty)
 the tomb of Fetekti (priest, end of Fifth Dynasty)
 the tomb of Qar and his sons (vizier, Sixth Dynasty)
 the rock cut tomb of Nakhtmin (charioteer)

Saite-Persian cemetery
On a small hill directly south of the pyramid of Neferefre is a cemetery of tombs from the Saite period:
 the tomb of Udjahorresnet
 the tomb of Iufaa
 the tomb of Menekhibneko
 the tomb of Padihor
 tomb R3

A temple 
Also found at Abusir were substantial remains of a Ramesside temple, perhaps built by Ramses II. The temple lies about 500 meters south east of the pyramids, close to the cultivation in the desert. The main building of the temple was built of limestone. There were three cellars, a small hall with four columns and a courtyard (with mudbrick walls) with ten limestone columns. The limestone building was placed within a larger complex made of mud bricks with a pylon and magazines. The temple seems to have been dedicated to the solar cult, in particular the gods Ra, Amun, and Nekhbet. Fragments of polychrome reliefs and numerous examples of the titles of Ramesses II have been recovered.

Site looting during 2011 protests
Abusir, Saqqara and Dahshur suffered damage by looters during the 2011 Egyptian protests. Part of the false door from the tomb of the priest Rahotep was stolen, and store rooms were broken into.

Climate
Köppen-Geiger climate classification system classifies it climate as hot desert (BWh), as the rest of Egypt.

See also 

Memphite Necropolis
List of ancient Egyptian towns and cities
List of ancient Egyptian sites, including sites of temples
Double Pyramid
List of megalithic sites

References

External links

 Czech Institute of Egyptology: Abúsír, the site
 Egyptian monuments: Abusir Necropolis
 Waseda University Expedition to Abusir South 

 
Giza Governorate
Cities in ancient Egypt
Ruins in Egypt